The American Football League (AFL, 1960–1969) had a unique take on the uniforms of referees, umpires, line judges, field judges and back judges.  With their red-orange stripes, black collars and cuffs, and AFL logos on their shirt fronts, sleeves and caps, they were not only more colorful, but easier to see than those of the other league. They were especially unique when seen on color television, which was also on the rise in the 1960s. Both the National Football League and All-America Football Conference had used colored uniforms in the 1940s.

In his book COLORS, Jim Finks Jr., son of Pro Football Hall-of-Famer Jim Finks, Sr., shows the original uniform of AFL official Jack Reader, who was a back judge in the first AFL game in 1960 and in both the first and third AFL-NFL World Championship games. Reader was in an iconic January 20, 1969 Sports Illustrated photo, signaling a touchdown after Matt Snell's 4-yard plunge against the Colts.

The following list indicates men who were American Football League on-field officials: an important but seldom-credited part of the game.  Nine, as shown in the list below, officiated in the American Football League for the entire ten years of its existence, 1960 through 1969.  They were: Ben Dreith (FJ, R); Bob Finley (U, R); Hugh Gamber (BJ, FJ); Elvin Hutchison (HL); John McDonough (R); Walt Parker (U); Jack Reader (BJ, R); Al Sabato (HL) and George Young (U).

There were 34 on-field officials in the AFL in 1969, the league's last year of play. 33 of them were good enough to continue to officiate after the merger.  One of them was Cal Lepore, now known as "the father of instant replay".  He also promulgated the use of replay to review the accuracy of on-field calls, for the evaluation of officials.  Another important link from the American Football League to today's professional football.

Notes:
 Bob Austin (AFL Supervisor of Officials, 1960–1965)
 Mel Hein (AFL Supervisor of Officials, 1966–1969)
 Jack Reader (Officiated the first AFL game in 1960. Ten-year American Football League official, 1960–1969)

 Jim Tunney received an offer from the AFL to be a referee in 1960, but chose to go to the NFL as a field judge. 
 Years before Pete Gogolak, Fritz Graf was the first "jumper" from the AFL to the NFL.  He was in the AFL in 1960, officiated its first Championship, then went to the NFL in 1961.
 Jack Reader, who died in 2008, was a ten-year AFL official who worked the league's first game (Broncos-Patriots) on September 9, 1960 and the first Super Bowl.
 Bob Wortman was the first man to officiate both a Super Bowl and an NCAA basketball championship.
 Frank Rustich was an AFL line judge and also a boxing referee who officiated at the 1973 Ken Norton - Muhammad Ali Heavyweight Boxing Championship.

See also
 List of American Football League players

External links
 AFL officials' uniforms

1960s-related lists
Lists of referees and umpires
American football-related lists